Olivia Apps (born December 1, 1998) is a Canadian rugby union and sevens player.

Career
Apps was part of Canada's 2018 Commonwealth Games team that finished in fourth place.

In June 2021, Apps was named to Canada's 2020 Olympic team as an alternate. In September 2021, following the Olympics, she was named Captain of the Canada's Women's 7s national rugby team.

Apps competed for Canada at the 2022 Rugby World Cup Sevens in Cape Town. They placed sixth overall after losing to Fiji in the fifth place final.

Personal life
Apps is the daughter of Alfred Apps and Danielle French. At seven years old, she was diagnosed with alopecia universalis. She began competitive rugby at age 15.

References

1998 births
Living people
Sportspeople from Victoria, British Columbia
Canada international rugby sevens players
Rugby sevens players at the 2020 Summer Olympics
Olympic rugby sevens players of Canada
Canada international women's rugby sevens players
Rugby sevens players at the 2022 Commonwealth Games
21st-century Canadian women